Pachipenta is a village in Vizianagaram district of the Indian state of Andhra Pradesh. It is located in Pachipenta mandal.

History

Pachipenta gained sudden significance in the later medieval history of Kalinga under its rulers - the Jeypore Suryavanshis. According to historians like N. Senapati & N.K.Sahu, the zamindari of Pachipenta was founded by Vishwambhar Dev I (1672-1676) who freed Kalinga from the weakened Golconda sultanate by defeating the Nawab of Chicacole (Sri Kakulam) in 1673. He granted the zamindari of Pachipenta that comprised seven villages to Tammanna Dora with the title of 'Dakshina Kavata Durga-raj' or the 'lord of the southern portal'. Viswambhar re-established the position of his kingdom and became the Maharajah of Kalinga. 

The zamindar of Pachipenta in 1712 claimed independence from the kingdom of Jeypore that was breaking into different fragments under the weak rule of Balaram Dev III. The British entered the region in 1775 and captured all tiny zamindaris including Pachipenta. In 1908, Maharaja Sir Vikram Dev III purchased the zamindari for six lakhs and the region re-immersed into the territory of Jeypore kings until 1947.

Geography
It has an average elevation of 219 meters (721 ft). It is bounded by Koraput district of Orissa state on the Northern side.

Demography
Pachipenta Mandal has a population of 43,995 in 2001. Males consists of 22,144 and females 21,851 of the population. The average literacy rate is 35%, lowest in the entire the district. Male literacy rate is 43% and that of females 26%.

References 

 

Villages in Vizianagaram district
Mandal headquarters in Vizianagaram district